John Beck (born January 28, 1943) is an American retired actor, known for his role as Mark Graison in the television series Dallas during the mid-1980s.

Early life
Beck was born in Chicago, Illinois but he grew up in Evanston and Joliet on his father's ranch with the goal of becoming a veterinarian. His goals changed at the age of sixteen after performing in a play in high school to overcome shyness. Three years later, Beck moved to California and took jobs in television commercials. In 1963-4, Beck attended Joliet Junior College but quit to begin acting in plays in other cities.

Career
Beck's television debut was as a Sergeant in the 1965 I Dream of Jeannie episode, "Russian Roulette". His first regular role was on the western series Nichols (1971-1972) alongside James Garner, playing the role of Orv Ketcham.

In film, one of Beck's earliest roles was as Skinny in Cyborg 2087 (1966). Beck played Erno who leads a revolt against a fascist government in the Woody Allen sci-fi comedy Sleeper (1973). That same year, he appeared as John W. Poe in the Sam Peckinpah western Pat Garrett and Billy the Kid. In 1975, he appeared opposite James Caan as Moonpie in Rollerball. He had a leading role in The Other Side of Midnight (1977), which had some prestige, but the film was a failure at the box office. Other film credits include The Big Bus (1976), Audrey Rose (1977), Deadly Illusion (1987), In the Cold of the Night (1990), A Climate for Killing (1991), Last Time Out (1994), Black Day Blue Night (1995), Dark Planet (1997), A Place to Grow (1998), Chain of Command (2000), Crash Point Zero (2001), Timecop 2: The Berlin Decision (2003), and Crash Landing (2005).

Beck also took guest roles in television soap operas, movies, and series, one of the most popular being, Dallas. Guest appearances include, Baywatch, Bonanza, Death Valley Days, Diagnosis: Murder, Gunsmoke, Hawaii Five-O, Magnum, P.I., Mannix, Matlock, Mission: Impossible, The Mod Squad, Murder, She Wrote, Perry Mason: The Case of the Lady in the Lake, Star Trek: Deep Space Nine, Touched by an Angel, The Twilight Zone (1989), and Walker, Texas Ranger, among others.

Recurring soap opera roles include, Dorian Blake in Peyton Place: The Next Generation, Sam Curtis in Flamingo Road, 
David Raymond in Santa Barbara, and Bruce in Passions.

As a voice actor, Beck played the role of the Punisher, Frank Castle in Spider-Man: The Animated Series.

Personal life
On April 23, 1971 in Los Angeles, Beck married Valerie Shellibeer (also known by her stage name, Tina Carter). The couple had a son and three daughters.

Filmography
A partial filmography follows.

Film

 Cyborg 2087 (1966) as Skinny
 A Good Time with a Bad Girl (1967) as Cowboy (uncredited)
 Three in the Attic (1968) as Jake
 Lawman (1971) as Jason Bronson
 Mrs. Pollifax-Spy (1971) as Lulash
 Pat Garrett and Billy the Kid (1973) as Poe
 Paperback Hero (1973) as Pov
 Sleeper (1973) as Erno Windt
 Only God Knows (1974) as Reverend Philip Norman
 Nightmare Honeymoon (1974) as Lee
 Rollerball (1975) as Moonpie
 The Big Bus (1976) as Shoulders
 Sky Riders (1976) as Ben
 Audrey Rose (1977) as Bill Templeton
 The Other Side of Midnight (1977) as Larry Douglas
 Deadly Illusion (1987) as Alex Burton
 In the Cold of the Night (1990) as Rudy
 A Climate for Killing (1991) as Kyle Shipp
 Star Trek VI: The Undiscovered Country (1991) as Waiter (uncredited)
 Last Time Out (1994) as Joe Dolan
 Black Day Blue Night (1995) as Chief Morris Reed
 Dark Planet (1997) as General
 A Place to Grow (1998) as Paul Shuler
 Chain of Command (2000) as General Peterson
 The Alternate (2000) as President Fallbrook
 Militia (2000) as Dep. Dir. Anderson
 Crash Point Zero (2001) as Dr. Maurice Hunter
 Timecop 2: The Berlin Decision (2003) as O'Rourke
 Crash Landing (2005) as General McClaren

Television

References

External links 
 
 

Living people
Male actors from Illinois
American male film actors
American male television actors
American male soap opera actors
American male voice actors
Actors from Joliet, Illinois
1943 births